The Surveillant was a 16-gun brig of the French Navy, built in 1799, launched the next year, and put in service in 1801.

She took part in L'Hermite's expedition before returning to France carrying despatches.

She was demolished in 1811.

Age of Sail naval ships of France
Ships built in France